Sam Harry Sutton (born 10 December 2001) is a New Zealand professional footballer who plays as a left-back for A-League Men club Wellington Phoenix.

Club career

Wellington Phoenix Reserves
Sutton joined the Wellington Phoenix as part of their academy in 2016 after moving down from Auckland. He started playing for the Wellington Phoenix Reserves in the New Zealand Football Championship in the 2016–17 season, making 4 appearances with 2 starts. His debut in the national league was two weeks before he turned 15 when he came on in their away game against Southern United with the team leading 1–0 and looking for their first back-to-back wins in the reserve team's history.

Wellington Phoenix
Sutton started training with the first team players during pre-season July 2019. On 21 December 2019, Sutton made his A-League debut as a stoppage time substitute in the Phoenix 2–2 draw against Sydney FC in Sydney. He followed that up with another 25 mins and his Sky Stadium home debut against Western Sydney Wanderers

Sutton got his first start on the 25 July 2020 in a 1–1 draw with Adelaide United playing for 60 minutes in an attacking midfield role. With young teammates Callan Elliot and Te Atawhai Hudson-Wihongi also starting alongside Sutton, the starting XI in this match was the youngest in club history, with an average age of 25.02 years.

On the 29 October 2020, Sutton signed a three-year deal with the Phoenix, his first professional contract with the club. On 21 March 2022, Sutton extended his contract with the Phoenix for a further two years until the end of the 2024–25 season.

Personal life
Sutton grew up on Auckland's North Shore and played for East Coast Bays as a junior. He was spotted by Wellington Phoenix's Academy Director Paul Temple at 12 years old and was asked to attend the Academy. After moving to Wellington with his family, Sutton enrolled at Wellington College while training with the Phoenix academy.

Career statistics

Club

References

External links

2001 births
Living people
New Zealand association footballers
Wellington Phoenix FC players
Association football midfielders
People educated at Wellington College (New Zealand)
Association footballers from Auckland
Footballers at the 2020 Summer Olympics
Olympic association footballers of New Zealand